This is a list of members of the Tasmanian House of Assembly between the 3 June 1925 election and the 30 May 1928 election. The Liberal grouping was a minor party which had split from the Nationalists.

Notes
  Labor MHA for Darwin, James Hurst, resigned in June 1926. A recount on 30 June 1926 elected Labor candidate Henry Lane.
  Labor MHA for Wilmot and Speaker of the House, Michael O'Keefe, was killed in a railway accident on 2 October 1926. A recount on 22 October 1926 elected Labor candidate John Palamountain.

Sources
 
 Parliament of Tasmania (2006). The Parliament of Tasmania from 1856

Members of Tasmanian parliaments by term
20th-century Australian politicians